The Skipanon River is a tributary of the Columbia River, approximately  long, on the Pacific coast of northwest Oregon in the United States. It is the last tributary of the Columbia on the Oregon side, draining an area of coastal bottom land bordered by sand dunes and entering the river from the south at its mouth west of Astoria.

It flows north parallel to the coast and east of U.S. Route 101. The mouth of the river is at river mile  of the Columbia upstream from its mouth.

The river's name comes from the Clatsop language, originally referring to a point at the river's mouth rather than the river itself. The charts of the Lewis and Clark Expedition show the stream as Skipanarwin Creek. Another variant spelling, Skeppernawin, was common on maps into the 20th century.

See also
List of rivers of Oregon

References

External links
Skipanon Watershed Assessment Report (August, 2000) (PDF)
Skipanon River Watershed Council 
Fisheries, Missions, and Settlements 
Bit of history: "We went up the Skipanon River frum Astoria, where father settled on a squatter's claim."

Rivers of Oregon
Rivers of Clatsop County, Oregon
Tributaries of the Columbia River
Oregon placenames of Native American origin